Telki is a village near Budakeszi, in Hungary, some  away from Budapest.

External links
Telki's official web page

Populated places in Pest County